Lars Anders Grahn (born 11 June 1958) is a Swedish curler.

Teams

References

External links
 

Living people
1958 births
Swedish male curlers
Swedish curling champions